The NC State Wolfpack women's basketball team represents North Carolina State University in NCAA Division I women's basketball.

History

The early years (1974–1981)
The women's basketball team at NC State had its beginnings in 1974. Under first head coach Robert "Peanut" Doak, North Carolina State won the first game it played 57–45 over the Virginia Cavaliers on December 7, 1974, en route to an 11–4 final record.

Kay Yow, the former head coach of the Elon Phoenix, was hired July 1, 1975 as coordinator of women's athletics and women's basketball coach. Coach Yow began her legendary coaching career on December 6, 1975, and recorded her first win with the Wolfpack, a 68–64 triumph over the College of Charleston Cougars, on January 10, 1976. On January 27, 1976, the Wolfpack beat the North Carolina Tar Heels 68–58 in the first televised women's basketball game in North Carolina history. In her first season as the head coach, Kay Yow led her squad to the quarterfinals of the 1976 National Women's Invitation Tournament.

The 1977–78 season was a breakout year for the women's basketball program. On January 12, 1978, the Wolfpack beat the #1 Wayland Baptist Flying Queens 98–86 for its first ever win over a number one ranked team. In addition, the team won the inaugural ACC regular season championship and advanced to the Elite Eight of the AIAW Tournament where Wayland Baptist avenged its earlier season loss to the Wolfpack. NC State was ranked third in the final AP Poll of the 1977–78 season, its highest final ranking in school history.

On February 10, 1980, the Wolfpack won its first ACC tournament championship with an 85–75 victory over the Maryland Terrapins. NC State finished the season undefeated in conference play, capturing the ACC regular season title as well. The Wolfpack advanced to the second round, which was the Sweet 16, of the AIAW Tournament in both 1980 and 1981, foreshadowing the success NC State would later enjoy in the NCAA Tournament.

A legend emerges (1981–2009)
The NCAA began sanctioning women's college basketball during the 1981–82 season, and on March 13, 1982, the Wolfpack defeated the Northwestern Wildcats 75–71 in its first NCAA Tournament game. The team won the regular season ACC title for the third time in school history in the 1982–83 season.

On November 26, 1983, Kay Yow won her 200th career game with a 60–54 triumph over the Miami Hurricanes.

The 1984–85 season was a very successful season, with the Wolfpack women winning their fourth regular season and second ACC tournament championships. The Wolfpack defeated North Carolina 81–80 on March 3, 1985, to claim the ACC tournament title. NC State won its third ACC tournament title on March 2, 1987, with a 57–56 win over Virginia.

On February 18, 1988, Coach Yow defeated the Wake Forest Demon Deacons 62–61 to collect her 100th career ACC victory. During the offseason, Yow led the United States Olympic women's basketball team to a gold medal in the 1988 Olympics.

NC State won its fifth regular season ACC championship to date in the 1989–90 season.

The Wolfpack women set an ACC record for the most points scored in a game on December 8, 1990. NC State defeated the Western Carolina Catamounts 137–65 in a record that still stands today. On January 12, 1991,  #3 NC State lost a triple-overtime game 123–120 to #2 Virginia. The 243 total points scored is an ACC record.

The Wolfpack captured its fourth of five ACC tournament titles to date on March 4, 1991, by beating Clemson 84–61.

NC State made its deepest NCAA tournament run in 1998. On March 23, the Wolfpack defeated the Connecticut Huskies 60–52 to earn a berth in the Final Four. On March 27, North Carolina State took the floor in Kansas City to take on the Louisiana Tech Lady Techsters, but the team ultimately fell 84–65.

On January 24, 1999, Coach Yow became the second coach to achieve 200 career ACC wins with NC State's 85–60 victory at Wake Forest. NC State retired the first set of women's basketball jerseys in school history on February 13, 2000. Genia Beasley, Trudi Lacey, Chasity Melvin, Linda Page, Andrea Stinson, Trena Trice, and Susan Yow each had her jersey retired.

On June 10, 2000, Coach Yow was one of 24 players and coaches inducted into the second class of the Women's Basketball Hall of Fame, and on September 27, 2002, Yow was enshrined into the Naismith Basketball Hall of Fame.

Nine Wolfpack players, including Genia Beasley, Summer Erb, Trudi Lacey, Rhonda Mapp, Chasity Melvin, Linda Page, Andrea Stinson, Trena Trice and Susan Yow, were named to the ACC's 50th anniversary women's basketball team on September 25, 2002. The nine players were the second most of all ACC schools.

Coach Yow recorded her 600th win at NC State on December 2, 2004, with a 65–36 win over the Seton Hall Pirates. On January 22, 2006, Coach Yow coached her 1,000th career game when NC State beat the Dartmouth Big Green 78–43. She was one of only four NCAA Division I basketball coaches to coach 1,000 games. On February 5, 2007, she became just the sixth coach in Division I women's basketball history to win 700 games with a 68–51 victory over the Florida State Seminoles. The Reynolds Coliseum floor was renamed "Kay Yow Court" on February 16, 2007. That night, the Wolfpack upset #2 North Carolina 72–65. On March 18, 2007, Yow recorded her 650th win at NC State with an 84–52 defeat of the Robert Morris Colonials.

Kay Yow died on January 24, 2009, after a 21-year battle with breast cancer. In her legendary career at NC State, she won almost 700 games, guided her teams to 20 NCAA tournaments, advanced to the Sweet 16 eleven times, and recorded 29 winning seasons.

Kellie Harper era (2009–2013)
On April 16, 2009, former Tennessee Lady Volunteers player and Western Carolina Catamounts head coach Kellie Harper was named the third head coach in NC State women's basketball history. Lady Volunteers head coach Pat Summitt said, "North Carolina State is getting a young and rising star in the game in Coach Kellie Jolly Harper. I am proud for Kellie. I expect she will do a great job in a very competitive conference – she has what it takes to be successful."

Coach Harper picked up her first win as the Wolfpack head coach on November 13, 2009, with an 87–71 win over the Florida International Golden Panthers.

Harper was fired on March 25, 2013, after a 4-year record of 70–64.

Wes Moore era (2013–Present)
Wes Moore, head coach at University of Tennessee-Chattanooga, was named as the fourth head coach in program history on April 4, 2013.
Since his hiring, Coach Moore has led a resurgence in Women's Basketball at NC State.

In his first season at NC State (2013–14), Moore led the Wolfpack to a 25–8 record, a fourth-place finish in the ACC standings, and an NCAA Tournament appearance. For his efforts, he was named the ESPNW ACC Coach of the Year. After an 18-15 campaign in 2014-15 and a 20–11 season in 2015–16, Moore led the Wolfpack to the NCAA Tournament Round of 32 in 2016–17 with an impressive 23–9 record (12-4 ACC). On March 1, 2017, he earned the official ACC Coach of the Year honor in votes by both the league's Blue Ribbon Panel and head coaches, earning the first such honor in the 43-year history of the NC State women's basketball program. He was also named a Naismith Women's College Coach of the Year Semifinalist after authoring upsets of four top-15 teams throughout the season: No. 2 Notre Dame, at No. 6 Florida State, No. 12 Duke, and at No. 7 Louisville.

In 2019 Coach Moore was the runner-up for the AP National Coach of the Year award.

His 2017-2018 and 2018-2019 teams make back-to-back trips to the Sweet Sixteen round of the NCAA Tournament. His 2019-2020 team won the Wolfpacks first ACC Tournament Championship since 1991 with senior point guard Aislinn Konig being named the tournament MVP.

The 2020-2021 team spent the entire regular season ranked inside the top 10, most of which was spent in the top 5, achieving a high rank of #2, matching a school record for highest ranking. On December 3, 2020, the #8 NCSU women beat the #1 ranked South Carolina team in Columbia with a final score of 54–46. The team was ranked #4 when they also beat the #1 ranked Louisville team in Louisville on February 1, 2020, by a score of 74–60. This was the first time a women's college basketball team has beaten a top ranked team twice in a season on the road. The team only experienced 2 losses in the regular season, both of which were away games which were later avenged with home wins.

The 2020-2021 team went into the conference tournament as the #2 seed and repeated as ACC Tournament Champions on March 7, 2021, beating the top seeded Louisville Cardinals 58–56. Junior Center Elissa Cunane was named the tournament MVP after averaging 23.3 points per game and 9.0 rebounds per game for the tournament. In their semifinal game against the #3 seeded Georgia Tech Yellow Jackets, the team overcame a 10-point deficit in the 4th quarter to win by a final score of 66–61.

For the 2021 NCAA tournament, the team earned the program's first ever #1 seed.

Year by year results

Conference tournament winners noted with # Source 

|- style="background:#ffd;"
| colspan="8" style="text-align:center;"| Atlantic Coast Conference

Postseason results

NCAA Division I
NC State has appeared in 27 NCAA Tournaments, with a record of 29–27.

AIAW Division I
The Wolfpack made three appearances in the AIAW National Division I basketball tournament, with a combined record of 3–3.

References

External links